The Wheel of the Year is an annual cycle of seasonal festivals, observed by many modern pagans, consisting of the year's chief solar events (solstices and equinoxes) and the midpoints between them. While names for each festival vary among diverse pagan traditions, syncretic treatments often refer to the four solar events as "quarter days", with the four midpoint events as "cross-quarter days". Differing paths of modern paganism may vary regarding the precise timing of each celebration, based on such distinctions as lunar phase and geographic hemisphere.

Observing the cycle of the seasons has been important to many people, both ancient and modern. Contemporary Pagan festivals that rely on the Wheel are based to varying degrees on folk traditions, regardless of actual historical pagan practices. Among Wiccans, each festival is also referred to as a sabbat, based on Gerald Gardner's view that the term was passed down from the Middle Ages, when the terminology for Jewish Shabbat was commingled with that of other heretical celebrations. Contemporary conceptions of the Wheel of the Year calendar were largely influenced by mid-20th century British paganism.

Origins

Historical and archaeological evidence suggests ancient pagan and polytheist peoples varied in their cultural observations; Anglo-Saxons celebrated the solstices and equinoxes, while Celts celebrated the seasonal divisions with various fire festivals. In the tenth century Cormac Mac Cárthaigh wrote about "four great fires...lighted up on the four great festivals of the Druids...in February, May, August, and November."

The contemporary Neopagan festival cycle, prior to being known as the Wheel of the Year, was influenced by works such as The Golden Bough by James George Frazer (1890) and The Witch-Cult in Western Europe (1921) by Margaret Murray. Frazer claimed that Beltane (the beginning of summer) and Samhain (the beginning of winter) were the most important of the four Gaelic festivals mentioned by Cormac. Murray used records from early modern witch trials, as well as the folklore surrounding European witchcraft, in an attempt to identify the festivals celebrated by a supposedly widespread underground pagan religion that had survived into the early modern period. Murray reports a 1661 trial record from Forfar, Scotland, where the accused witch (Issobell Smyth) is connected with meetings held "every quarter at Candlemas, Rud−day, Lammas, and Hallomas." In The White Goddess (1948) Robert Graves claimed that, despite Christianization, the importance of agricultural and social cycles had preserved the "continuity of the ancient British festal system" consisting of eight holidays: "English social life was based on agriculture, grazing, and hunting" implicit in "the popular celebration of the festivals now known as Candlemas, Lady Day, May Day, Midsummer Day, Lammas, Michaelmas, All-Hallowe'en, and Christmas; it was also secretly preserved as religious doctrine in the covens of the anti-Christian witch-cult."

By the late 1950s the Bricket Wood coven led by Gerald Gardner and the Order of Bards, Ovates and Druids led by Ross Nichols had both adopted eight-fold ritual calendars, in order to hold more frequent celebrations. Popular legend holds that Gardner and Nichols developed the calendar during a naturist retreat, where Gardner advocated for celebrating  the solstices and equinoxes while Nichols preferred celebrating the four Celtic fire festivals; ultimately they combined the two approaches into a single festival cycle. Though this coordination eventually had the benefit of more closely aligning celebrations between the two early Neopagan groups, Gardner's first published writings omit any mention of the solstices and equinoxes, focusing exclusively on the fire festivals. Gardner initially referred to these as "May eve, August eve, November eve (Hallowe'en), and February eve." Gardner further identified these modern witch festivals with the Gaelic fire festivals Beltene, Lugnasadh, Samhuin, and Brigid (Imbolc). 

The phrase Wheel of the Year was being used by the mid-1960s to describe the annual cycle of eight holidays. Aidan Kelly gave names to the summer solstice (Litha) and equinox holidays (Ostara and Mabon) of Wicca in 1974, which were subsequently promulgated by Timothy Zell through his Green Egg magazine. Popularization of these names happened gradually; in her 1978 book Witchcraft For Tomorrow influential Wiccan author Doreen Valiente did not use Kelly's holiday names, instead simply identifying the solstices and equinoxes ("Lesser Sabbats") by their seasons. Valiente identified the four "Greater Sabbats", or fire festivals, by the names Candlemas, May Eve, Lammas, and Hallowe'en, though she also identified their Irish counterparts as Imbolc, Beltane, Lughnassadh, and Samhain.

Due to early Wicca's influence on modern paganism and the syncretic adoption of Anglo-Saxon and Celtic motifs, the most commonly used English festival names for the Wheel of the Year tend to be the Celtic ones introduced by Gardner and the mostly Germanic-derived names introduced by Kelly, regardless whether the celebrations are based on those cultures.

Festivals

In many traditions of modern pagan cosmology, all things are considered to be cyclical, with time as a perpetual cycle of growth and retreat tied to the Sun's annual death and rebirth. This cycle is also viewed as a micro- and macrocosm of other life cycles in an immeasurable series of cycles composing the Universe. The days that fall on the landmarks of the yearly cycle traditionally mark the beginnings and middles of the four seasons. They are regarded with significance and host to major communal festivals. These eight festivals are the most common times for community celebrations.

In addition to the quarter and cross-quarter days, other festivals may also be celebrated throughout the year, especially in the context of polytheistic reconstructionism and other ethnic traditions. While festivals of the Wheel are steeped in solar mythology and symbolism, many Wiccan esbats are commonly based on lunar cycles. Together, they represent the most common celebrations in Wiccan-influenced forms of Neopaganism, especially in contemporary Witchcraft groups.

Winter Solstice (Yule)

Midwinter, known commonly as Yule or within modern Druid traditions as Alban Arthan, has been recognised as a significant turning point in the yearly cycle since the late Stone Age. The ancient megalithic sites of Newgrange and Stonehenge, carefully aligned with the solstice sunrise and sunset, exemplify this. The reversal of the Sun's ebbing presence in the sky symbolizes the rebirth of the solar god and presages the return of fertile seasons. From Germanic to Roman tradition, this is the most important time of celebration.

Practices vary, but sacrifice offerings, feasting, and gift giving are common elements of Midwinter festivities. Bringing sprigs and wreaths of evergreenery (such as holly, ivy, mistletoe, yew, and pine) into the home and tree decorating are also common during this time.

In Roman traditions additional festivities take place during the six days leading up to Midwinter.

Imbolc (Candlemas)

The cross-quarter day following Midwinter falls on the first of February and traditionally marks the first stirrings of spring. It aligns with the contemporary observance of Groundhog Day. It is time for purification and spring cleaning in anticipation of the year's new life. In Rome, it was historically a shepherd's holiday, while the Celts associated it with the onset of ewes' lactation, prior to birthing the spring lambs.

For Celtic pagans, the festival is dedicated to the goddess Brigid, daughter of The Dagda and one of the Tuatha Dé Danann.

Among Reclaiming tradition Witches, this is the traditional time for pledges and rededications for the coming year and for initiation among Dianic Wiccans.

Spring Equinox (Ostara)

Derived from a reconstruction produced by linguist Jacob Grimm of an Old High German form of the Old English goddess name Ēostre, Ostara marks the vernal equinox in some modern Pagan traditions.

Known as Alban Eilir to modern Druid traditions, this holiday is the second of three spring celebrations (the midpoint between Imbolc and Beltane), during which light and darkness are again in balance, with light on the rise. It is a time of new beginnings and of life emerging further from the grips of winter.

Beltane (May Eve)

Traditionally the first day of summer in Ireland, in Rome the earliest celebrations appeared in pre-Christian times with the festival of Flora, the Roman goddess of flowers, and the Walpurgisnacht celebrations of the Germanic countries.

Since the Christianisation of Europe, a more secular version of the festival has continued in Europe and America, commonly referred to as May Day. In this form, it is well known for maypole dancing and the crowning of the Queen of the May.

Celebrated by many pagan traditions, among modern Druids this festival recognizes the power of life in its fullness, the greening of the world, youthfulness and flourishing.

Summer Solstice (Litha)

Midsummer is one of the four solar holidays and is considered the turning point at which summer reaches its height and the sun shines longest. Among the Wiccan sabbats, Midsummer is preceded by Beltane, and followed by Lammas or Lughnasadh.

Some Wiccan traditions call the festival Litha, a name occurring in Bede's The Reckoning of Time (eighth century), which preserves a list of the (then-obsolete) Anglo-Saxon names for the twelve months. Bede writes that "Litha means gentle or navigable, because in both these months the calm breezes are gentle and they were wont to sail upon the smooth sea".

Modern Druids celebrate this festival as Alban Hefin. The sun in its greatest strength is greeted and celebrated on this holiday. While it is the time of greatest strength of the solar current, it also marks a turning point, for the sun also begins its time of decline as the wheel of the year turns. Arguably the most important festival of the Druid traditions, due to the great focus on the sun and its light as a symbol of divine inspiration. Druid groups frequently celebrate this event at Stonehenge.

Lughnasadh (Lammas)

Lammas or Lughnasadh is the first of the three Wiccan harvest festivals, the other two being the autumnal equinox (or Mabon) and Samhain. Wiccans mark the holiday by baking a figure of the god in bread and eating it, to symbolise the sanctity and importance of the harvest. Celebrations vary, as not all Pagans are Wiccans. The Irish name Lughnasadh is used in some traditions to designate this holiday. Wiccan celebrations of this holiday are neither generally based on Celtic culture nor centered on the Celtic deity Lugh. This name seems to have been a late adoption among Wiccans. In early versions of Wiccan literature the festival is referred to as August Eve.

The name Lammas (contraction of loaf mass) implies it is an agrarian-based festival and feast of thanksgiving for grain and bread, which symbolises the first fruits of the harvest. Christian festivals may incorporate elements from the Pagan Ritual.

Autumn Equinox (Mabon)

Among the sabbats, it is the second of the three Pagan harvest festivals, preceded by Lammas / Lughnasadh and followed by Samhain.

Samhain (Hallows)

Samhain is one of the four Greater Sabbats among Wiccans. Samhain is typically considered as a time to celebrate the lives of those who have passed on, and it often involves paying respect to ancestors, family members, elders of the faith, friends, pets, and other loved ones who have died. Aligned with the contemporary observance of Halloween and Day of the Dead, in some traditions the spirits of the departed are invited to attend the festivities. It is seen as a festival of darkness, which is balanced at the opposite point of the Wheel by the festival of Beltane, which is celebrated as a festival of light and fertility.

Many Neopagans believe that the veil between this world and the afterlife is at its thinnest point of the year at Samhain, making it easier to communicate with those who have departed.

Some authorities claim the Christian festival of All Hallows Day (All Saints Day) and the preceding evening are appropriations of Samhain by early Christian missionaries to the British Isles.

Practice
Celebration commonly takes place outdoors in the form of a communal gathering.

Dates of celebration
The precise dates on which festivals are celebrated often vary to some degree, as would the related agricultural milestones of the local region. Celebrations may occur on the astrologically precise quarter and cross-quarter days, the nearest full moon, the nearest new moon, or the nearest weekend for contemporary convenience. The festivals were originally celebrated by peoples in the middle latitudes of the Northern Hemisphere. Consequently, the traditional timing for seasonal celebrations do not align with the seasons in the Southern Hemisphere or near the equator. Pagans in the Southern Hemisphere often advance these dates by six months to coincide with their own seasons.

Offerings

Offerings of food, drink, various objects, etc. have been central in ritual propitiation and veneration for millennia. Modern pagan practice strongly avoids sacrificing animals in favour of grains, herbs, milk, wines, incense, baked goods, minerals, etc. The exception being with ritual feasts including meat, where the inedible parts of the animal are often burned as offerings while the community eats the rest.

Sacrifices are typically offered to gods and ancestors by burning them. Burying and leaving offerings in the open are also common in certain circumstances. The purpose of offering is to benefit the venerated, show gratitude, and give something back, strengthening the bonds between humans and divine and between members of a community.

Heathen observances

Heathens may add to the demarcations of the Wheel of the Year with various Days of Remembrance celebrating heroes of the Edda and the Sagas, figures of Germanic history, and the Viking Leif Ericson, who explored parts of North America. The American Ásatrú movement has adopted the Runic Era Calendar, which includes:
Vali's Blot (14 February)
Celebration dedicated to the god Váli and to love
Feast of the Einherjar (11 November)
Celebration to honor kin who died in battle
Ancestors’ Blot (11 November)
Celebration to honor one's ancestors
Yggdrasil Day (22 April)
Celebration of the world tree Yggdrasil, of the reality world it represents, of trees and nature
Winterfinding (mid-October)
Celebration marking the beginning of winter, held on a date between Haustblot and Winternights
Summerfinding (mid-April)
Celebration marking the beginning of summer, held on a date between Ostara and Walpurgis Night

Narratives

Celtic

It is a misconception in some quarters of the Neopagan community, influenced by the writings of Robert Graves, that historical Celts had an overarching narrative for the entire cycle of the year. While the various Celtic calendars include some cyclical patterns, and a belief in the balance of light and dark, these beliefs vary between the different Celtic cultures. Modern preservationists and revivalists usually observe the four 'fire festivals' of the Gaelic Calendar, and some also observe local festivals that are held on dates of significance in the different Celtic nations.

Slavic

Slavic mythology tells of a persisting conflict involving Perun, god of thunder and lightning, and Veles, the black god and horned god of the underworld. Enmity between the two is initiated by Veles' annual ascent up the world tree in the form of a huge serpent and his ultimate theft of Perun's divine cattle from the heavenly domain. Perun retaliates to this challenge of the divine order by pursuing Veles, attacking with his lightning bolts from the sky. Veles taunts Perun and flees, transforming himself into various animals and hiding behind trees, houses, even people. (Lightning bolts striking down trees or homes were explained as results of this.) In the end Perun overcomes and defeats Veles, returning him to his place in the realm of the dead. Thus the order of the world is maintained.

The idea that storms and thunder are actually divine battle is pivotal to the changing of the seasons. Dry periods are identified as chaotic results of Veles' thievery. This duality and conflict represents an opposition of the natural principles of earth, water, substance, and chaos (Veles) and of heaven, fire, spirit, order (Perun), not a clash of good and evil. The cosmic battle between the two also echoes the ancient Indo-European narrative of a fight between the sky-borne storm god and chthonic dragon.

On the great night (New Year), two children of Perun are born, Jarilo, god of fertility and vegetation and son of the Moon, and Morana, goddess of nature and death and daughter of the Sun. On the same night, the infant Jarilo is snatched and taken to the underworld, where Veles raises him as his own. At the time of the spring equinox, Jarilo returns across the sea from the world of the dead, bringing with him fertility and spring from the evergreen underworld into the realm of the living. He meets his sister Morana and courts her. With the beginning of summer, the two are married bringing fertility and abundance to Earth, ensuring a bountiful harvest. The union of Perun's kin and Veles' stepson brings peace between two great gods, staving off storms which could damage the harvest. After the harvest, however, Jarilo is unfaithful to his wife and she vengefully slays him, returning him to the underworld and renewing enmity between Perun and Veles. Without her husband, god of fertility and vegetation, Morana – and all of nature with her – withers and freezes in the ensuing winter. She grows into the old and dangerous goddess of darkness and frost, eventually dying by the year's end only to be reborn again with her brother in the new year.

Wicca and Druidry

In Wicca, the narrative of the Wheel of the Year traditionally centers on the sacred marriage of the God and the Goddess and the god/goddess duality. In this cycle, the God is perpetually born from the Goddess at Yule, grows in power at the vernal equinox (as does the Goddess, now in her maiden aspect), courts and impregnates the Goddess at Beltane, reaches his peak at the summer solstice, wanes in power at Lammas, passes into the underworld at Samhain (taking with him the fertility of the Goddess/Earth, who is now in her crone aspect) until he is once again born from Her mother/crone aspect at Yule. The Goddess, in turn, ages and rejuvenates endlessly with the seasons, being courted by and giving birth to the Horned God.

Many Wiccan, Neo-Druid, and eclectic Neopagans incorporate a narrative of the Holly King and Oak King as rulers of the waning year and the waxing year respectively. These two figures battle endlessly with the turning of the seasons. At the summer solstice, the Holly King defeats the Oak King and commences his reign. After the Autumn equinox the Oak King slowly begins to regain his power as the sun begins to wane. Come the winter solstice the Oak King in turn vanquishes the Holly King.After the spring equinox the sun begins to wax again and the Holly King slowly regains his strength until he once again defeats the Oak King at the summer solstice. The two are ultimately seen as essential parts of a whole, light and dark aspects of the male God, and would not exist without each other.

The Holly King is often portrayed as a woodsy figure, similar to the modern Santa Claus, dressed in red with sprigs of holly in his hair and the Oak King as a fertility god.

See also

 Ember days, quarterly periods (usually three days) of prayer and fasting in the liturgical calendar of Western Christian churches.
 List of neo-pagan festivals and events
 Medicine wheel, metaphor for a variety of Native American spiritual concepts
 Solar terms, year's divisions in China and East Asia

Calendars 

 Celtic calendar
 Gaelic calendar
 Welsh seasonal festivals
 Germanic calendar
 Runic calendar
 Hellenic calendars
 Attic calendar
 Macedonian calendar
 Roman calendar
 Roman festivals

References

External links

 Astronomical cusps and pagan holidays
 Celebrating the Seasons at Circle Sanctuary 
 Sun Moon calendar
 Festival Calendar for the Indo-Europeans
 Atheopagan Sabbaths

Modern pagan holidays
Time in religion
Wicca
Neo-druidism
1950s in modern paganism

cs:Sabat (wicca)